The events of 1963 in anime.

Events 
In March, NBC Enterprises announced that it would begin syndicating 52 episodes of Astro Boy in the United States. The series would begin airing in September, and the English adaptation would be headed by Fred Ladd.

Accolades
Ōfuji Noburō Award: Wanpaku Ōji no Orochi Taiji

Releases

See also
1963 in animation

References

External links 
Japanese animated works of the year, listed in the IMDb

Anime
Anime
Years in anime